Achlya klebsiana is a plant pathogen. Studies say that this fungi potentially poses threats against fish in the Nile.

A. klebsiana has been found infecting farmed Channa striatus, and appeared to be causing significant disease.

A. klebsiana is a significant cause of germination failures in rice.

References

Further reading

External links 
 Index Fungorum
 USDA ARS Fungal Database

Water mould plant pathogens and diseases
Species described in 1915
Saprolegniales